The qualifying play-off of the 2013 AFC Cup was played on 9 February 2013, to decide one of the 32 places in the group stage.

Draw
The draw for the qualifying play-off was held on 6 December 2012, 15:00 UTC+8, at the AFC House in Kuala Lumpur, Malaysia.

The following three teams (all from West Asia Zone) were entered into the qualifying play-off draw:
 Al-Wahda
 Regar-TadAZ
 Al-Ahli Taizz

Due to the withdrawal of Al-Muharraq after the draw was held, Regar-TadAZ, which were initially drawn to play the winner between Al-Wahda and Al-Ahli Taizz for a place in the group stage, were directly entered into Group A, while the winner between Al-Wahda and Al-Ahli Taizz would be entered into Group B to replace Al-Muharraq.

Format
Each tie was played as a single match, with extra time and penalty shoot-out used to decide the winner if necessary. The winner advanced to the group stage to join the 31 automatic qualifiers.

Match

|}

Notes

References

External links

1